Steven Barron (born 4 May 1956) is an Irish-British filmmaker. He is best known for directing the music videos for the songs "Billie Jean" by Michael Jackson, "Summer of '69" and "Run to You" by Bryan Adams, "Money for Nothing" by Dire Straits, "Electric Avenue" and "I Don't Wanna Dance" by Eddy Grant, "Let's Get Rocked" by Def Leppard, "Going Underground" by The Jam, "Don't You Want Me" by The Human League, "Baby Jane" by Rod Stewart, "Pale Shelter" by Tears for Fears, "Africa" by Toto, and "Take On Me" by A-ha. The videos for "Take On Me" and "Billie Jean" have each garnered over 1 billion views on YouTube. Barron also directed several films, including Teenage Mutant Ninja Turtles (1990), Coneheads (1993), The Adventures of Pinocchio (1996) and Mike Bassett: England Manager (2001).

Early life
Barron was born in Dublin on 4 May 1956, the son of filmmaker Zelda Barron (née Solomons; 1929–2006) and actor Ron Barron. His mother was born in Manchester to an English mother and Russian father. His parents married in 1953 but the marriage was later dissolved. He has an older sister named Siobhan. He was raised in London and attended St Marylebone Grammar School.

Career

Barron made his music video directorial debut in 1979 with "Time for Action" by Secret Affair and their following hit singles "My World" and "Sound of Confusion" and directed, and occasionally wrote additional treatment for, various music videos. These videos, which include "Billie Jean" by Michael Jackson, "Money for Nothing" by Dire Straits, and "Take On Me" by a-ha, would come to define the medium during the early days of MTV and are still considered among the best of all time. He founded the production company Limelight with his sister Siobhan and Adam Whitaker.

In 1984, he directed the science fiction comedy Electric Dreams, and then went on to direct several episodes of the television series The Storyteller before returning to film, directing the films Teenage Mutant Ninja Turtles in 1990, The Adventures of Pinocchio in 1996, Rat in 2000 and Mike Bassett: England Manager in 2001. Barron directed several award-winning miniseries, such as Merlin (1998), Arabian Nights (2000) and Dreamkeeper (2003) for Hallmark Entertainment. In July 2010, it was revealed that Barron would make a return to music videos, directing "Butterfly, Butterfly", the then-final video of a-ha.

In late 2011, Barron's two-part production of Treasure Island was shown on British Sky Broadcasting.

In November 2014, Barron published his autobiography, Egg n Chips & Billie Jean: A Trip Through the Eighties.

Filmography

Film

Television

Music videos
 A-ha – "Take On Me" (1985), "The Sun Always Shines on T.V." (1985), "Hunting High and Low" (1986), "Cry Wolf" (1986), "Manhattan Skyline" (1987), "The Living Daylights" (1987), "Crying in the Rain" (1990), "Butterfly, Butterfly" (2010)
 Adam and the Ants – "Antmusic" (1980)
 Bryan Adams – "Cuts Like a Knife" (1983), "Run to You" (1984), "Heaven" (1985), "Summer of '69" (1985) 
 Culture Club – "God Thank You Woman" (1986)
 David Bowie – "As the World Falls Down" (1986) "Underground" (1986)
 Def Leppard – "Let's Get Rocked" (1992)
 Dire Straits – "Money for Nothing" (1985), "Calling Elvis" (1990), "Heavy Fuel" (1991)
 Dolly Parton – "Potential New Boyfriend" (1983)
 Eddy Grant – "Electric Avenue" (1982), "I Don't Wanna Dance" (1982), "Living on the Front Line" (1983)
 Fleetwood Mac – "Hold Me" (1982)
 Fun Boy Three – "It Ain't What You Do...." (1982)
 Heaven 17 – "Penthouse and Pavement" (1981), "Let Me Go" (1982), "Temptation" (1983)
 The Human League – "Don't You Want Me" (1981), "Love Action" (1981), "(Keep Feeling) Fascination" (1983)
 The Jam – "Strangetown" (1978), "When You're Young" (1979), "Going Underground" (1979), "Dreams of Children" (1979)
 Joe Jackson – "Steppin' Out" (1982), "Real Men" (1982), "Breaking Us in Two" (1982)
 Level 42 - "Heaven in My Hands" (1988)
 Madonna – "Burning Up" (1983)
 Michael Jackson – "Billie Jean" (1983)
 Natalie Cole & Nat King Cole – "Unforgettable" (1991)
 Orchestral Manoeuvres in the Dark – "Maid of Orleans" (1982)
 Paul McCartney – "Pretty Little Head" (1986)
 Rod Stewart - "Baby Jane" (1983)
 Secret Affair – "Time for Action" (1979), "My World" (1980), "Sound of Confusion" (1980)
 Sheena Easton - "For Your Eyes Only" (1981), "Telephone" (1983)
 Simple Minds – "Promised You a Miracle" (1982)
 Skids - "Iona" (1981)
 Styx – "Haven't We Been Here Before" (1983)
 Supertramp – "Cannonball" (1985), "Better Days" (1986)
 Tears for Fears – "Pale Shelter" (1983)
 Toto – "Africa" (1982), "Rosanna" (1982), "Stranger in Town" (1984)
 ZZ Top – "Rough Boy" (1986), "Sleeping Bag" (1986)

References

External links

1956 births
Comedy film directors
English film producers
English music video directors
English people of Russian descent
Irish film producers
Irish music video directors
Irish people of Russian descent
Living people
People educated at St Marylebone Grammar School
Film directors from London